Albert Bittlmayer (8 November 1952 – 2 June 1977) was a German footballer who made a combined total of 142 league appearances for 1. FC Nürnberg and Tennis Borussia Berlin until he died of cancer at the age of 24.

References

External links 
 

1952 births
1977 deaths
Deaths from cancer in Germany
German footballers
Association football forwards
Bundesliga players
2. Bundesliga players
1. FC Nürnberg players
Tennis Borussia Berlin players
20th-century German people